Goyencourt is a commune in the Somme department in Hauts-de-France in northern France.

Geography
Cereal growing is the primary agricultural activity.

History
 The vestiges of a Gallo-Roman villa can be found within the boundaries of the commune.
 In the 8th and 9th century, the village was under the control of the abbey of Ourscamp.
 Middle Age: Lords of Gossencourt ("Goyencourt").
 In 1653, during the upheaval of the Fronde, the village was ransacked by the Spanish army, led by Louis II de Bourbon, Prince de Condé, who laid siege to Roye.
 By 1918, at the end of the First World War, the village and the chateau lay in ruins.

Population

Places of interest
 The modern church of Saint-Martin
 The chapel of Notre-Dame-de-Liesse

See also
Communes of the Somme department

References

External links

 Goyencourt Tourist Office 

Communes of Somme (department)